Jonathan Benjamin Gill (born 7 December 1986) is an English actor, farmer, presenter and singer-songwriter. He is best known as a member of boy band JLS, who came second on The X Factor in 2008. They went on to have five number-one singles and sold over 10 million records worldwide before disbanding in December 2013.

Early life
Gill was born on 7 December 1986 in Croydon, London. He is the son of Cynthia and Keith Gill and has one brother, Neequaye. He spent the first five years of his life living in Antigua, discovering his musical talent at a very early age. After completing his exams at university, he decided to audition for The X Factor in 2007. It was at this point that he came into contact with the other members of JLS. Gill grew up, mostly, in Croydon and began making music at the age of seven when he played the recorder, piano, flute and guitar. At the age of nine, he joined the choir and went on to perform at the local church. Gill concentrated on his music and began studying at The Centre for Young Musicians.

After leaving the CYM, Gill stayed involved with the school music scene. He was involved with the choir at school. He continued this until he was 15 but had to give it up due to the pressures from the school to concentrate on his rugby career; he was involved with London Irish rugby club until he was 18. He eventually decided that he wanted to sing rather than play rugby and took up vocal coaching during a year out before attending university. During this period, Gill was contacted by Oritsé to try out for the band because of his musical ear and attention to harmonies. He studied theology at King's College London, staying in halls in Russell Square, before dropping out to pursue a music career.

Career

Gill joined boy band UFO, later known as JLS, in 2007. The group auditioned for The X Factor in 2008, managed by Louis Walsh. They finished runners-up behind Alexandra Burke. They later signed a record deal with Epic Records.

In December 2012, Gill won the Christmas Special of the BBC One dancing show Strictly Come Dancing, performing the Jive with Ola Jordan.

In 2013, JLS announced via Twitter they had decided to split up after their farewell tour and album and book.

In 2014, Gill sang on a song titled "Best Night OML" produced by Charlie Hedges. This made him the first member of JLS to release solo material. Later that year, Gill competed on Celebrity MasterChef.

Beginning on 1 February 2015, he took part in the second series of The Jump.

In August 2015, having been involved in the turkey farming industry for some years, he became one of the main presenters on CBeebies programme [[Down on the Farm (CBeebies series)|Down on the Farm]] alongside Storm Huntley.In November 2015, he appeared on the show, Countryfile. In September 2016, he appeared on Who's Doing the Dishes?. In February 2017, he appeared on the ITV show Dance Dance Dance alongside his wife Chloe and finished in 3rd place. From 2017, he has been a presenter on the BBC's Songs of Praise.

Personal life
Gill used to play rugby but gave it up to concentrate on his singing career. He does, however, still take part in charity matches. He played for England in the 2015 fixture of Rugby Aid, which sees a team of celebrities and professional rugby players take part in an 'England vs The Rest of the World' match to raise money for the charity Help For Heroes.

In late 2008, Gill began dating backing dancer Chloe Tangney. They married in 2014 and have two children; a son called Ace Jeremiah Gill and a daughter called Chiara Sapphire Gill. Gill is a Christian.

Gill is a supporter of charities including the Red Cross and the Woodland Trust.

Filmography
TelevisionThe X Factor (2008) – Contestant, as part of JLSCountryfile (2012) – GuestThe Paul O'Grady Show (2014) – GuestCelebrity MasterChef (2014) – ContestantThe Jump (2015) – ContestantDown on the Farm (2015–2021) – PresenterThe Chase Celebrities (2015) – ContestantTipping Point Lucky Stars (2016) – ContestantDance Dance Dance (2017) – ContestantSongs of Praise (2017–present) – PresenterRichard Osman's House of Games'' (2018) – Contestant

References

External links
Official JLS website
Official Twitter

1986 births
Living people
21st-century Black British male singers
Alumni of King's College London
British pop singers
English Christians
English farmers
English people of Antigua and Barbuda descent
People educated at Whitgift School